Dan Hennah is a production designer from New Zealand who worked on The Lord of the Rings and The Hobbit films. He won an Oscar for The Lord of the Rings: The Return of the King.

Personal life
Dan Hennah has been married since 17 March 1973 to Chris Hennah. His wife also helped on the Lord of the Rings and Hobbit films as an art department manager.

Filmography 
 1983: Nate and Hayes
 1987: White Water Summer
 1992 Cumulus 9
 1999: The Tribe
 2001: The Lord of the Rings: The Fellowship of the Ring
 2002: The Lord of the Rings: The Two Towers
 2003: The Lord of the Rings: The Return of the King
 2005: King Kong
 2007: The Water Horse: Legend of the Deep
 2009: Underworld: Rise of the Lycans
 2010: The Warrior's Way
 2012: The Hobbit: An Unexpected Journey
 2013: The Hobbit: The Desolation of Smaug
 2014: The Hobbit: The Battle of the Five Armies
 2016: Ice Fantasy
 2016: Alice Through the Looking Glass
 2017: Thor: Ragnarok
 2018: Mortal Engines
 2019: Dora and the Lost City of Gold
 2020: Love and Monsters
 2022: Disenchanted

Oscar nominations
All of these are in Best Art Direction.

2001 Academy Awards-Nominated for The Lord of the Rings: The Fellowship of the Ring. Nomination shared with Grant Major. Lost to Moulin Rouge!.
2002 Academy Awards-Nominated for The Lord of the Rings: The Two Towers. Nomination shared with Grant Major and Alan Lee. Lost to Chicago.
2003 Academy Awards-The Lord of the Rings: The Return of the King. Award shared with Grant Major and Alan Lee. Won.
2005 Academy Awards-Nominated for King Kong. Nomination shared with Grant Major and Simon Bright. Lost to Memoirs of a Geisha.
2012 Academy Awards-Nominated for The Hobbit: An Unexpected Journey. Nomination shared with Simon Bright and Ra Vincent. Lost to Lincoln.

References

External links

Living people
People from Hastings, New Zealand
Year of birth missing (living people)
Best Art Direction Academy Award winners
New Zealand production designers
Art directors
Set decorators